Goulane West or Gowlan West is a small village located two miles southeast of Clifden in County Galway, Ireland. It is beside the N59 national secondary road. It has a population of 100.  To the north of the village is a hilly area which leads to the river. To the south is Killywongaun and a by-road which leads to Clifden and the Dooneen area. The name An Gabhlán means "the small fork".

There is also a Gowlan East or An Gabhlán Thoir in nearby Carna.

See also
 List of towns and villages in Ireland

References

Towns and villages in County Galway